Wallace Osgood Fenn (April 27, 1893 – September 20, 1971) was a prominent physiologist, chairman of the department of physiology at the University of Rochester from 1925 to 1959. He also headed the University's Space and Science center from 1964 to 1966. He was also the president of the American Physiological Society, the president of the American Institute of Biological Sciences, and the president of the International Union of Physiological Science. His work on heat generated by muscles, oxygen use by the nervous system, and potassium equilibrium in muscle, as well as pressure breathing and nitrogen narcosis, was recognized internationally. The New York Times called him a "leading physiologist". Other recognitions included: honorary degrees from the University of Chicago, the University of Brussels and from the University of Paris, as well as the following awards: Feltrinell International Prize for Experimental Medicine and the Guggenheim award of the International Academy of Astronautics.

Biography 
Fenn was born in Lanesborough, Massachusetts. He graduated from Harvard University with an A.B. degree in 1914. His graduate work and Ph.D. thesis were interrupted by World War I, and he finished it upon return from the army in 1919. He was an instructor at Harvard Medical School from 1919 to 1923. He then studied at the Rockefeller Institute for two years. Subsequently, he assumed his position as the chairman of the department of physiology at the University of Rochester, where he stayed until 1959. He specialized in the physiology of runners, then in aviation, and later in space exploration. The American Physiological Society obituary described him as "[a] sincerely modest man [who] avoided the spotlight and never dominated a meeting or conversation, but he was forceful when required and had a warm, outgoing nature with a delightful sense of humor".

Chronology 
 1893: Born August 27 in Lanesboro, Massachusetts
 1910: Graduated from Cambridge Latin School, Cambridge, Mass
 1914: A.B., Harvard University
 1916: A.M., Harvard University
 1917–1918: Second Lieutenant, US Army, Sanitary Corps
 1919: Ph.D., Harvard University (Plant Physiology)
 1919–1922: Instructor in Applied Physiology, Harvard Medical School
 1922–1924: Trabeling Fellow, Rockefeller Institute
 1924–1959: Professor and Chairman of Physiology, The University of Rochester School of Medicine and Dentistry
 1962–1966: Director, Space Science Center, The University of Rochester
 1961–1971: Distinguished Professor of Physiology
 1971: Died September 20 in Rochester, New York, after a brief illness

Awards 
 1943: National Academy of Sciences, Elected Member
 1949: John F. Lewis Prize, American Philosophical Society
 1958: Fold Medal Award, University of Rochester Medical Alumni Association
 1961: Certificate of Merit, Rochester Academy of Medicine
 1964: Daniel and Florence Guggenheim Award, International Academy of Astronautics
 1964: Antonio Feltrinelli International Prize for Experimental Medicine, Accademia Nazionale dei Lincei, Rome
 1967: Research Achievement Award, American Heart Association
 1971: Johannes Muller Medallion, The German Physiological Society
 1971: Ville de Monaco Medal

Honorary degrees 
 1950: University of Chicago, D.Sc
 1959: Universidad San Marcos, Peru, Catedratico
 1960: Universote de Paris, Docteur
 1965: Eniversite Libre de Bruxelles, Docteur
 1965: The University of Rochester, D.Sc

Notable publications 
 Respiration: 10 editions published between 1964 and 1976 in English and held in 278 libraries worldwide
 History of the American Physiological Society; the third quarter century, 1937–1962: 4 editions published in 1963 in English and held in 190 libraries worldwide
 History of the International Congresses of Physiological Sciences, 1889–1968: 7 editions published between 1968 and 1969 in English and held in 159 libraries worldwide
 Muscle: 1 edition published in 1941 in English and held in 33 libraries worldwide

Other publications:
 Daggs, R. G. Wallace O. Fenn, 1893–1971. Physiologist 14: 301–303, 1971.
 Physiology on horseback. Past-president's address. Am. J. Physiol. 159: 551–555, 1949.
 Fenn, W. O. Born fifty years too soon. Annu. Rev. Physiol. 24: 1–10, 1962.
 Fenn, W. O. History of the American Physiological Society: The Third Quarter Century, 1937–1962. Washington, DC: Am. Physiol. Soc., 1963.
 Fenn, W. O. (Editor) History of the International Congresses of Physiological Sciences, 1889–1968. Washington, DC: Am. Physiol. Soc., 1968.
 Rahn, H. Wallace O. Fenn, president of the American Physiological Society, 1946–1948. Physiologist 19: 1–10, 1976.
 Rahn, H. Wallace Osgood Fenn, August 27, 1893 – September 20, 1971. Biogr. Mem. Natl. Acad. Sci. 50: 141–173, 1979.

References

Further reading 
 Wallace O. Fenn, 1893-1971: memories and facts from friends here and abroad
 A Memorial service for Wallace Osgood Fenn, 1893-1971; Whipple Auditorium, University of Rochester, Medical Center, October 4, 1971, at 4:00 P.M.
 Hermann Rahn: In memoriam: Wallace O. Fenn, 1893-1971
National Academy of Sciences Biographical Memoir

1893 births
1971 deaths
American military personnel of World War I
American physiologists
Harvard Medical School faculty
Harvard University alumni
People from Berkshire County, Massachusetts
United States Army officers
University of Rochester faculty
Members of the United States National Academy of Sciences
Military personnel from Massachusetts